Cassie Rodish is an American mixed martial artist who competes in the Atomweight division. She has fought in Invicta FC.

Mixed martial arts record

|-
|Win
|align="center" |5–4
|Raquel Magdaleno 
|Submission (Rear-naked Choke)
|RFA 19: Collier vs Checco
|
|align="center" | 1
|align="center" | 4:50
|Prior Lake, Minnesota, United States
|
|-
|Loss
|align="center" |4–4
|Simona Soukupova
|Submission (standing guillotine choke)
|Invicta FC 5: Penne vs. Waterson
|
|align="center" | 2
|align="center" | 3:20
|Kansas City, Missouri, United States
|
|-
|Win
|align="center" |4–3
|Stephanie Frausto
|TKO (punches and elbows)
|Invicta FC 4: Esparza vs. Hyatt
|
|align="center" | 3
|align="center" | 1:04
|Kansas City, Kansas, United States
|
|-
|Win
|align="center" |3–3
|Summer Artherton
|Submission (rear-naked choke)
|MCC 43: High Octane
|
|align="center" | 2
|align="center" | 4:43
|Des Moines, Iowa, United States
|
|-
|Win
|align="center" |2–3
|Meghan Wright
|Submission (guillotine choke)
|Invicta FC 1: Coenen vs. Ruyssen
|
|align="center" | 1
|align="center" | 0:36
|Kansas City, Kansas, United States
|
|-
|Win
|align="center" |1–3
|Mariah Johnson
|TKO (punches)
|MCC 36: Back in Action
|
|align="center" | 1
|align="center" | 3:10
|Des Moines, Iowa, United States
|
|-
|Loss
|align="center" |0–3
|Margarita Chavez
|Decision (split)
|ECSC Friday Night Fights 3
|
|align="center" | 3
|align="center" | 5:00
|Clovis, New Mexico, United States
|
|-
|Loss
|align="center" |0–2
|Michele Gutierrez 
|Decision (unanimous)
|XFO 36: Outdoor War 6
|
|align="center" | 3
|align="center" | 5:00
|Island Lake, Illinois, United States
|
|-
|Loss
|align="center" |0–1
|Katy Klinefelter
|Submission (triangle choke)
|MCC 24: Reloaded
|
|align="center" | 2
|align="center" | 3:02
|Des Moines, Iowa, United States
|
|}

References

External links

1980 births
Mixed martial artists from Iowa
Living people
American female mixed martial artists
Atomweight mixed martial artists
Mixed martial artists utilizing karate
Mixed martial artists utilizing Brazilian jiu-jitsu
American practitioners of Brazilian jiu-jitsu
Female Brazilian jiu-jitsu practitioners
American female karateka
21st-century American women